Kobbi Nissim (קובי נסים) is a computer scientist at Georgetown University, where he is the McDevitt Chair of Computer Science. His areas of research include cryptography and data privacy. He is known for the introduction of differential privacy. Nissim studied at the Weizmann Institute with Professor Moni Naor.

Nissim's awards include:

 The 2013 ACM PODS Alberto O. Mendelzon Test-of-Time Award (joint with Irit Dinur).
 The 2017 Gödel Prize and 2016 Theory of Cryptography Test of Time Award (both joint with Cynthia Dwork, Frank McSherry, and Adam D. Smith) for the paper that introduced differential privacy.
 The 2018 Theory of Cryptography Test of Time Award (joint with Dan Boneh and Eu-Jin Goh).
 The 2019 Caspar Bowden Award for Outstanding Research in Privacy Enhancing Technologies (joint work with Aaron Bembenek, Alexandra Wood, Mark Bun, Marco Gaboardi, Urs Gasser, David R. O’Brien, Thomas Steinke, and Salil Vadhan).
 The 2021 Paris Kanellakis Award for "fundamental contributions to the development of differential privacy."

References 

Living people
American computer scientists
Gödel Prize laureates
Georgetown University faculty
American cryptographers
1965 births